Jay Lewis Benn (born 22 August 2001) is an English professional footballer who plays for Bohemians on loan from Lincoln City, as a defender.

Career
Born in Bradford, Benn began his career with FC Halifax Town, before signing for Lincoln City in July 2022. He made his debut for the club on 30 August 2022, in the EFL Trophy. On 10 February 2023 he joined League of Ireland Premier Division club Bohemians on loan.

Career statistics

References

2001 births
Living people
English footballers
FC Halifax Town players
Lincoln City F.C. players
Bohemian F.C. players
League of Ireland players
Association football defenders
English expatriate footballers
English expatriates in Ireland
Expatriate association footballers in the Republic of Ireland